Hemidactylus sinaitus, also known as the Red Sea gecko or Sinai leaf-toed gecko,  is a species of gecko. It is found in Yemen and northeastern Africa between Egypt and Somalia.

References

Hemidactylus
Reptiles of North Africa
Reptiles of the Middle East
Reptiles of Ethiopia
Vertebrates of Eritrea
Reptiles of Somalia
Vertebrates of Sudan
Reptiles of the Arabian Peninsula
Reptiles described in 1885
Taxa named by George Albert Boulenger